Vladimir Sergeevich Syromyatnikov (January 7, 1933 - September 19, 2006) was a Soviet and Russian space scientist best known for designing docking mechanisms for crewed spacecraft; it was his Androgynous Peripheral Attach System which, in the 1970s, linked the Soviet and American space capsules in the Apollo-Soyuz test flight.

Syromyatnikov also helped design and develop Vostok, the world's first crewed spacecraft, which launched Yuri Gagarin into space in 1961.

In the 1990s, he updated the design of his docking mechanism for the meeting of the Mir space station and the Atlantis Space Shuttle. Syromyatnikov's designs are still used by spacecraft visiting the International Space Station.

See also 
 Apollo-Soyuz Test Project
 Shuttle-Mir Program

References 

 Interview in the IEEE Spectrum, April 2006
 "S. P. Korolev. Encyclopedia of life and creativity" - edited by C. A. Lopota, RSC Energia. S. P. Korolev, 2014 

Soviet aerospace engineers
Soviet space program personnel
1933 births
Corresponding Members of the Russian Academy of Sciences
2006 deaths
Bauman Moscow State Technical University alumni
Employees of RSC Energia
Soviet inventors